Heleen van Royen (born Helena Margaretha Kroon; 9 March 1965, in Amsterdam) is a Dutch novelist and columnist. Her novel De gelukkige huisvrouw ("The Happy Housewife") was best-selling Dutch novel of 2010. The candid descriptions of sexuality (including her own) found in her books and her columns have drawn considerable attention, as have her personal revelations about sexual fantasies, even to the point of ridicule: Dorine Wiersma won the Annie M.G. Schmidt award for best theatrical song for "Stoute Heleen" ("Naughty Heleen"), a crude pastiche of van Royen's depictions of her own sexuality. Two of van Royen's novels were adapted for film, De gelukkige huisvrouw (2009, adapted for the stage in the same year), and De ontsnapping (The Escape, 2010). She has two children, daughter Olivia and son Sam. In November 2006, van Royen posed nude for Playboy.

Publications
 De gelukkige huisvrouw, 2000
 Godin van de jacht, 2003
 De ontsnapping, 2006
 De mannentester, 2009
 De naaimachine : over moederschap, 2010
 Bloed, zweet en tranen, 2011
 Verboden vruchten, 2012
 De hartsvriendin, 2013
 Sexdagboek, 2018

References

1965 births
Living people
21st-century Dutch novelists
21st-century Dutch women writers
Chick lit writers
Dutch columnists
Dutch sex columnists
Dutch women novelists
Dutch women columnists
Writers from Amsterdam